Blakely is a borough in Lackawanna County, Pennsylvania, United States. It is part of Northeastern Pennsylvania. The population was 6,657 at the 2020 census.

The Lackawanna River flows through Blakely, and within the borough is the village of Peckville.

History
The borough is named after naval hero Johnston Blakely, who captainained the sloop Wasp during the War of 1812.  The "Johnston Blakeley Memorial" in Blakely is a large anchor from the aircraft carrier , decommissioned in the 1960s.

In the 1970s, Blakely was home to Masterpiece Inc., the seventh largest manufacturer of artificial Christmas trees.

Geography

Demographics

As of the census of 2010, there were 6,564 people, 2,816 households, and 1,742 families in the borough. The population density was 1,727.4 people per square mile (667/km2). There were 3,024 housing units at an average density of 795.8 per square mile (310.9/km2). The racial makeup of the borough was 96.6% White, 1% African American, 0.1% Native American, 0.1% Pacific Islander, 0.7% Asian, 0.6% from other races, and 0.9% from two or more races. Hispanic or Latino of any race were 1.8% of the population.

There were 2,816 households, out of which 23% had children under the age of 18 living with them, 45.1% were married couples living together, 12.2% had a female householder with no husband present, and 38.1% were non-families. 33.2% of all households were made up of individuals, and 17.9% had someone living alone who was 65 years of age or older. The average household size was 2.23 and the average family size was 2.85.

In the borough the population was spread out, with 18.3% under the age of 18, 56.6% from 18 to 64, and 25.1% who were 65 years of age or older. The median age was 47.2 years.

The median income for a household in the borough was $38,153, and the median income for a family was $60,341. Males had a median income of $48,170 versus $32,158 for females. The per capita income for the borough was $23,063. About 6.6% of families and 12.4% of the population were below the poverty line, including 14.2% of those under age 18 and 5.3% of those age 65 or over.

Parks and recreation
The "Blakely Borough Recreation Complex" is public sports complex located on the bank of the Lackawanna River.  Formerly called "Mellow Park", the name was changed in 2013 after Bob Mellow was sent to prison.

Notable people
Gino J. Merli, Medal of Honor recipient
 Stan Palys, professional baseball player
 Joe Shaute, professional baseball player
Bill Sienkiewicz, comic book artist

References

External links

Populated places established in 1786
Boroughs in Lackawanna County, Pennsylvania
1786 establishments in Pennsylvania